The Fujifilm FinePix J series of digital cameras consists of the later models of the company's entry-level point and shoot digital cameras. The J series is a partial replacement range for the A series range.

The first J-series model released was the 8.2-megapixel J10, which was released in early 2008. As of February 2009, there are eight different models in the J-series range, from the J10 up to and including the J150W. All models in the range are powered by lithium ion rechargeable batteries.  

All J-series cameras have the standard CCD sensors. The first few models, the J10, J12 and the J50 use the xD-Picture Card flash memory format, whilst the later models use SD/SDHC flash memory format, these include the J100, J110W, J120 and the J150W. The J15fd uses both flash memory formats.

Models

J10 (discontinued)
J12
J15fd (discontinued)
J20 (discontinued)
J26
J27
J30
J32
J35
J37 (discontinued)
J38
J40
J50 (discontinued)
J100 (discontinued)
J110w (discontinued)
J120 (discontinued)
J150w (discontinued)
JX200
J250 (discontinued)
JV250
JZ200
JZ210
JZ250
JZ100
JX300
JX350
JX370
JX400
JX580
JX550
JX520
JX500
JX550
JX560
JX680

See also 
 Fujifilm FinePix
 Fujifilm cameras
 Fujifilm

References

J series